Park Peremohy (Trudovi Rezervy) is a football stadium located in Mykolaiv, Southern Ukraine. 

The seating capacity of the stadium is 5,000 seats.

The stadium is located in northern part of the city at the Victory Party (Park Peremohy).

The latest reconstruction of the stadium started in 2013 and was finally ended in 2017.

References

External links
 Photo. UA-Football. 23 June 2017
 "Sports town" is an urban object that must become a valuable attraction of our city and the region, Hennadiy Nikolenko («Спортивне містечко – це той об’єкт, який має стати родзинкою нашого міста та області», - Геннадій Ніколенко). Sports portal of Mykolaiv Oblast.

Sports venues built in the Soviet Union
Football venues in Ukraine
Buildings and structures in Mykolaiv
Sport in Mykolaiv
Football venues in the Soviet Union
MFC Mykolaiv
Sports venues in Mykolaiv Oblast